U.S. Post Office is a historic post office building located at Florence, Florence County, South Carolina.  It was built about 1906, and is a three-story, sandstone and brick building with hipped roof Second Renaissance Revival style. A major three-story addition to the rear of the building was built about 1935.

It was listed on the National Register of Historic Places in 1977.

References

Post office buildings on the National Register of Historic Places in South Carolina
Renaissance Revival architecture in South Carolina
Government buildings completed in 1906
National Register of Historic Places in Florence County, South Carolina
Buildings and structures in Florence, South Carolina
1906 establishments in South Carolina